Sadhan Roy is a Bangladeshi cinematographer and actor. He won the Bangladesh National Film Award for Best Cinematography for the film Shuvoda (1986).

Selected films

Awards and nominations
National Film Awards

References

External links
 

Bangladeshi cinematographers
Best Cinematographer National Film Award (Bangladesh) winners